This is a list of Superleague Formula records since the inaugural 2008 Superleague Formula season. The list includes records for the football clubs, drivers and race teams who have competed in Superleague Formula. This list is accurate up to and including the final round of the 2010 championship at Navarra.

Championships

Pole positions
 Only pole positions earned from Saturday qualifying are counted, i.e. only Race 1 pole positions. Race 2 pole positions, awarded by virtue of the reverse grid, are not included, nor are Super Final poles.

Race 1 and 2 starts
 Only four of the football clubs who have competed in Superleague Formula have started 100% of all races, and Craig Dolby is the only driver to have started 100% of all races.

Race 1 and 2 wins

Race 1 and 2 podiums

Fastest laps
 These are fastest laps attained in races 1 and 2, not including Super Finals.

Points in one weekend
 A maximum of 100 points can be scored from Races 1 and 2 by one club/driver in a single weekend.

1. 91 points were scored in total by FC Basel/Wissel that weekend, including 1 point from the Super Final.

2. 88 points were scored in total by Olympiacos/Hanley that weekend, including 2 points from the Super Final.

3. 92 points were scored in total by Tottenham/Dolby that weekend, including 6 points from the Super Final.

4. 82 points were scored in total by Tottenham/Dolby that weekend, including 1 point from the Super Final.

5. 85 points were scored in total by Beijing/Martin that weekend, including 6 points from the Super Final.

NOTE - 82 points were scored in total by A.C. Milan/Buurman on the 2010 Magny-Cours weekend; 76 from races 1 and 2, and 6 points from the Super Final.

NOTE - 81 points were scored in total by Tottenham/Dolby on the 2010 Navarra weekend; 76 from races 1 and 2, and 5 points from the Super Final.

NOTE - 79 points were scored in total by Anderlecht/Rigon on the 2010 Adria weekend; 73 from races 1 and 2, and 6 points from the Super Final.

Total points
 In 2008 and 2009, a club/driver did not have to finish a race to score points, but did have to start.
 In 2010, a club/driver had to both start and finish a race in order to score points.
 Super Finals were first raced in 2009 but points were only awarded beginning in 2010.

 The highest percentage of points scored (relative to maximum points available) in a season was 413 by Beijing Guoan in 2008. Liverpool F.C. scored 412 points in 2009. With eleven points-scoring race weekends in 2010 instead of just six in previous years, champions R.S.C. Anderlecht scored 699 points, including points earned from Super Finals.

References

External links
 Superleague Formula Official Website
 V12 Racing: Independent Superleague Formula Fansite Magazine

Records
Superleague Formula